Jessica Maclennan (née Moulds; born 8 November 1989 in Helensville, New Zealand) is a New Zealand netball player, who currently plays for the Mainland Tactix in the ANZ Premiership. Formerly a shooter, she can play in the GK and GD positions. Maclennan formally played for the Northern Mystics, before joining the Tactix in 2014.

Maclennan played for the Fastnet Ferns in the 2010 World Netball Series, where she won a gold medal. She was also a part of the 2009 New Zealand U21 team, where she won a silver medal at the World Youth Championships.

In 2012, Maclennan made the newspapers all over New Zealand, when she was a part of the 'Harrison Hoist' where she lifted team-mate Anna Harrison to deflect a shot above the rim.

She is the older sister of New Zealand rugby union player Matt Moulds, who plays for the Blues in Super Rugby.

External links 
 2018 ANZ Premiership Profile
 2018 Canterbury Tactix Profile

References

1989 births
Living people
New Zealand netball players
Northern Mystics players
Mainland Tactix players
ANZ Championship players
ANZ Premiership players
People from Helensville
New Zealand international Fast5 players